The 2015–16 East Tennessee State Buccaneers basketball team represented East Tennessee State University during the 2015–16 NCAA Division I men's basketball season. The Buccaneers, led by first year head coach Steve Forbes, played their home games at the Freedom Hall Civic Center and were of the Southern Conference. They finished the season 24–12, 14–4 in SoCon play to finish in to second place. They defeated Mercer and Furman to advance to the championship game of the SoCon tournament where they lost to Chattanooga. They were invited to the inaugural Vegas 16, which only had eight teams, where they defeated Louisiana Tech in the quarterfinals to advance to the semifinals where they lost to Oakland.

Roster

Schedule

 
|-
!colspan=9 style="background:#041E42; color:#FFC72C;"| Exhibition
|-

|-
!colspan=9 style="background:#041E42; color:#FFC72C;"| Regular season
|-

|-
!colspan=9 style="background:#041E42; color:#FFC72C;"| SoCon tournament

|-
!colspan=9 style="background:#041E42; color:#FFC72C;"| Vegas 16

References

East Tennessee State Buccaneers men's basketball seasons
East Tennessee State
East Tennessee State
East Tennessee
East Tennessee